Hospital São Paulo is a metro station on Line 5 (Lilac) of the São Paulo Metro in the Vila Mariana district of São Paulo, Brazil.

References

Railway stations opened in 2018
São Paulo Metro stations